Abbas Hilmi may refer to:

Abbas I of Egypt (1813 – 1854), founder of the reigning dynasty of Egypt and Sudan at the time
Abbas II of Egypt (1874 – 1944), last Khedive of Egypt and Sudan
Prince Abbas Hilmi (born 1941), Egyptian prince and financial manager